Rišňovce is a village and municipality in the Nitra District in western central Slovakia, in the Nitra Region.

History
In historical records the village was first mentioned in 1272.

Geography
The village lies at an altitude of 161 metres and covers an area of 18.788 km². It has a population of about 1991 people.

Ethnicity
The population is about 99% Slovak.

References

External links
http://www.statistics.sk/mosmis/eng/run.html

Villages and municipalities in Nitra District